Yon-Rogg is a fictional character appearing in American comic books published by Marvel Comics. A military commander of the Kree alien race whose weaknesses are his jealousy of others' accomplishments and his love for the medic Una, he's dispatched to supervise Earth on behalf of the Supreme Intelligence. He is a foe of Captain Marvel, specifically the Carol Danvers version, and was indirectly responsible for her transformation into Ms. Marvel.

Jude Law portrayed the character in the Marvel Cinematic Universe film Captain Marvel (2019).

Publication history
Yon-Rogg first appeared in Marvel Super Heroes #12 (December 1967) and was created by Stan Lee and Gene Colan. He was introduced as a Kree commander sent to Earth to investigate how the planet's seemingly primitive inhabitants managed to destroy an advanced Kree Sentry. During this mission, he tried to kill Captain Marvel (Mar-Vell) out of jealousy and who was in a relationship with another Kree called Una. His schemes ended in Una dying, which resulted in animosity between the two.

Yon-Rogg later attempted to defeat his nemesis by kidnapping Carol Danvers and using her as a hostage. He was seemingly killed when a Kree device, a Psyche-Magnitron, exploded. That same explosion also awoke Carol's latent genetic potential, transforming her into the superhero Ms. Marvel. He returned years later as Magnitron, to enact revenge on Carol, who then known as Captain Marvel. Yon-Rogg attempted to telepathically torture Carol and destroy New York City. He was defeated once again, although it cost Carol her memories.

Fictional character biography
Yon-Rogg is a Kree military officer who is the commander of the Helion, a Kree spaceship that was sent to Earth by the Supreme Intelligence. Yon-Rogg had a deep hatred towards Mar-Vell due to his love for the Kree medic Una. He ends up leaving Mar-Vell on Earth so that Una can be his. Yon-Rogg later unleashes the Kree Sentry to dispose of Mar-Vell. During his fight with the Sentry, Mar-Vell learned that the Sentry attacking him was sent by Yon-Rogg. After Mar-Vell defeats the Kree Sentry, Yon-Rogg contacts Ronan the Accuser to pass judgement on Mar-Vell's actions. Ronan declines the offer stating that the mission was not jeopardized by Mar-Vell's actions.

Yon-Rogg was on his spaceship at the time when Mar-Vell was fighting Super-Skrull and hopes that Super-Skrull would kill Mar-Vell. After Mar-Vell breaks free from Super-Skrull's ship, Yon-Rogg refuses Mar-Vell's offer to return to Earth so that he can stop Super-Skrull.

Yon-Rogg later sabotages a rocket carrying deadly bacteria that was bound for space where it crashes into the ocean. When Mar-Vell arrives at the Cape, he is ordered by Yon-Rogg to prevent the humans from stopping the rocket from releasing the bacteria where Mar-Vell has his encounter with Namor.

Yon-Rogg has Mar-Vell put on trial for being "Un-Kree" by letting Namor beat him. Though Ronan the Accuser has Mar-Vell take out Mr. Logan upon him finding out his identity before a device Mar-Vell had ended up putting Mr. Logan into a coma.

During Mar-Vell's holographic training program, Yon-Rogg cranks up the setting hoping that Mar-Vell would die from the experience. Following Mar-Vell's fight with Solam, Yon-Rogg plans to put Mar-Vell on trial before Ronan the Accuser again.

Yon-Rogg then plans to kill Mar-Vell's fellow cape member Carol Danvers with Kree weapons with Mar-Vell saving her. Yon-Rogg plotted to use this to invoke jealousy in Una. After Mar-Vell had defeated Quasimodo, Yon-Rogg continues to make Una jealous of Mar-Vell and Carol's relationship.

When an Aakon spaceship approaches Earth, Yon-Rogg orders the Kree to attack the spaceship since the Kree have been age-old enemies of the Aakon race. During their fight on the moon, Yon-Rogg is injured and Mar-Vell had to kill the Aakok spaceship's leader to protect Yon-Rogg. While Yon-Rogg is recuperating, Mar-Vell assumes control of the Kree ship.

When Mar-Vell starts to develop a friendship with Carol Danvers, Ronan the Accuser orders Yon-Rogg to lead some Kree soldiers into executing Mar-Vell. Yon-Rogg is happy to oblige. After Una dies from her injuries upon being caught in the crossfire between the Kree and the Aakons, Zo frees Mar-Vell from the control bands that Yon-Rogg put on him, and has Mar-Vell go after Yon-Rogg for revenge upon bestowing new powers onto him. Mar-Vell uses his illusion casting to taunt Yon-Rogg into thinking that he is alive. While a supply ship is restocking the Kree ship, Mar-Vell ends having a brief fight with Yon-Rogg before returning to Earth to save Carol Danvers from Man-Slayer.

After being told by the Supreme Intelligence that Zo was actually Prime Minister Zarek in disguise as part of a plot by Ronan the Accuser to overthrow the Supreme Intelligence, Mar-Vell fends off Zarek, gains a new costume from the Supreme Intelligence, and leaves to go deal with Yon-Rogg.

Mar-Vell meets Rick Jones who tries on Mar-Vell's Nega Bands which he uses to have a brief fight with Yon-Rogg. Yon-Rogg manages to escape afterwards. Yon-Rogg begins his next plot against Mar-Vell. When Yon-Rogg captures Carol Danvers and Mar-Vell catches up to him, Yon-Rogg uses a Psyche-Magnitron to create a Kree Mandroid to help him fight Mar-Vell. During the fight, Carol Danvers is injured and the Psyche-Magnitron is damaged with some of its energies irradiating Carol Danvers. After Mar-Vell destroys the Kree Mandroid, Yon-Rogg is seemingly killed when the Psyche-Magnitron explodes. This battle led to Carol Danvers being exposed to the damaged Psyche-Magnitron's energies which would lead to her becoming Ms. Marvel.

Yon-Rogg is later revealed to have survived the Psyche-Magnitron's explosion, gaining a telepathic link with Carol Danvers' via a shard of the Magnitron that is lodged in her brain (which is also causing a brain-damaging lesion in Carol's head). After stealing the remains of the Psyche-Magnitron from Carol, Yon-Rogg tries to give it to the Kree Empire only to be turned down. He then takes the name "Magnitron" and uses Carol's memories and its power to recreate enemies from her past before attempting to drop a Kree city on top of New York City. Carol is able to destroy the telepathic link and Yon-Rogg's powers by aggravating the lesion in her head until it bursts, though at the cost of all her memories.

A flashback series shows Yon-Rogg's association with Mar-Vell and Una. The three are part of a Kree mission deep into Brood territory. Their mission is to rescue or terminate a Kree general that knows valuable military intelligence. Yon-Rogg earns the thanks of the Shi'ar ruler and the Imperial Guard when the Kree rescue them from Skrull attackers. The Kree move on and find the general. A Brood attack leaves Mar-Vell, Una and Yon-Rogg stranded for weeks; this is after Mar-Vell risks his life to save Yon-Rogg. The three are rescued by the same Shi'ar they previously saved.

Powers and abilities
Yon-Rogg has super-strength, agility, and stamina. He is also skilled in unarmed combat.

Other versions

Ultimate Marvel
In the Ultimate Marvel universe, Yahn-Rgg is first mentioned by Mahr Vehl battling a Kree Lifeform attacking a S.H.I.E.L.D. Aerospace Station-Q in New Mexico as one of its programmers. He is later seen on the Kree homeworld insulting Mahr (alluding to a heated rivalry in the past), until knocked out by Invisible Woman.

Earth-X
Yoh-Rogg is seen as a part of the Realm of the Dead in Earth X.

In other media

Television
Yon-Rogg appears in The Avengers: Earth's Mightiest Heroes, voiced by Fred Tatasciore. In the episode "459", he sends a Kree Sentry to Earth to determine if it is worthy to join the Kree Empire. After the Hulk decapitates it, Mar-Vell pleads for Yon-Rogg to call off the Sentry, but the latter refuses and activates the robot's self-destruct sequence. In the episode "Welcome the Kree Empire", Yon-Rogg accompanies Mar-Vell, Ronan the Accuser, and Kalum Lo to Earth to make the planet surrender to the Kree Empire. The Kree attack the Earth, but are defeated by the Avengers and S.W.O.R.D. and remanded to Prison 42.

Film

Yon-Rogg appears in the live-action film Captain Marvel, portrayed by Jude Law. This version is the leader of Starforce who leads the Kree's war against the Skrulls. While hunting down former Kree scientist Mar-Vell, who is hiding on Earth as Dr. Wendy Lawson, he encounters Carol Danvers after she destroys an experimental engine and gains powerful abilities. Yon-Rogg brings her to the Kree homeworld of Hala, donates his blood to her to save her life, and has her memories altered to make her believe she is a Kree named Vers. Over the course of the following six years, he becomes her mentor and commanding officer. While on a mission, Danvers is separated from Starforce and lands on Earth. Yon-Rogg pursues her, only to discover that Danvers has recovered her memories and discovered the truth of the war. Starforce captures her and a group of Skrull refugees, but she breaks free and defeats several members of Starforce. After defeating Yon-Rogg, she sends him back to the Supreme Intelligence with a warning.

Video games
Yon-Rogg as Magnitron is an unlockable playable character and boss in Lego Marvel's Avengers, as part of the "Classic Captain Marvel Pack" DLC.

References

External links
 
 Yon-Rogg at Comic Vine
 

Characters created by Gene Colan
Characters created by Stan Lee
Kree
Comics characters introduced in 1967
Marvel Comics characters with superhuman strength
Marvel Comics extraterrestrial supervillains
Marvel Comics supervillains